Michael Torke (born September 22, 1961) is an American composer who writes music influenced by jazz and minimalism.

Torke was born in Milwaukee, Wisconsin, where he attended Wilson Elementary School, graduated from Wauwatosa East High School, and studied at the Eastman School of Music with Joseph Schwantner and Christopher Rouse, and at Yale University.

Works

Sometimes described as a post-minimalist, his most characteristically postminimal piece is Four Proverbs, in which the syllable for each pitch is fixed and variations in the melody produce streams of nonsense words. Other works in this style include Book of Proverbs and Song of Isaiah.  An early piece where he first used a certain post-minimalist style was Vanada, made in 1984.  His best-known work is probably Javelin, which he composed in 1994, commissioned by the Atlanta Committee for the Olympic Games in celebration of the Atlanta Symphony Orchestra's 50th anniversary season, in conjunction with the 1996 Summer Olympics. Commissioned by Disney and Michael Eisner for the New York Philharmonic's Millennium Celebration, he wrote Four Seasons, an oratorio for chorus and orchestra celebrating various aspects of the months. He wrote a ballet in 2002, The Contract, with choreography by James Kudelka. Torke was also commissioned to help Chicago celebrate the centennial of Daniel Burnham's 1909 Plan of Chicago and produced a work entitled Plans that was performed at the Grant Park Music Festival in June 2009.

A synesthete, he is the composer of numerous pieces (Bright Blue Music, Ecstatic Orange) which include colors in the titles, later made into the suite Color Music. Other pieces include the opera The Directions (1986), Rust (1989), influenced by rap and disco, Telephone Book (1985, 1995), Adjustable Wrench, and Ash (1989) and Mass (1990), which received criticism for an attempt at the style of Beethoven and Mendelssohn.

In 2003, he created his own record label, Ecstatic Records, on which he re-released a set of six 1990s CDs that were deleted by the now out-of-business Argo Records, which was a subsidiary of Decca Records.

His opera Pop'pea, a rock opera version of Monteverdi's L'incoronazione di Poppea, was commissioned by the Théâtre du Châtelet in Paris and premiered there on May 29, 2012.

Awards
Independent Music Awards 2012: Tahiti – Best Instrumental Album

References

External links
Michael Torke Official Site
Classical Net: Michael Torke
New York City Opera: Learning Center: Resources Center: Biographies: Michael Torke
Publisher

Listening
Boosey & Hawkes: Michael Torke Sound Samples

1961 births
Living people
20th-century American composers
20th-century American male musicians
20th-century classical composers
21st-century American composers
21st-century American male musicians
21st-century classical composers
American classical composers
American male classical composers
American opera composers
Ballet composers
Composers for carillon
Eastman School of Music alumni
Male opera composers
Pupils of Christopher Rouse (composer)